MV Fenella (III) No. 165289 was a cargo vessel operated by the Isle of Man Steam Packet Company, and the third ship in the Company's history to bear the name. Fenella was built by Ailsa Shipbuilding Company at Troon in 1951, and was the Company's first motor ship and first modern cargo vessel.

Dimensions
Her purchase cost was £163,783. She had a 7-cylinder British Polar engine of 1,185 indicated horsepower. When the vessel was high and dry in port at low water, the diesel generators were cooled by circulating water from the ballast tanks as though they were radiators.

Service life
In 1951 the Steam Packet started to modernize its cargo fleet and chose the Ailsa Shipbuilding Company at Troon to build its first motor ship.
Fenella carried cars, cattle and general cargo.

Disposal and loss
In the early 1970s containerization resulted in a marked upsurge in freight business. In 1973 alone, there was a 31 per cent rise in cargo. It was first expected that the Peveril operating alongside Ramsey would be able to meet this demand, and the company made the decision to sell the Fenella at the beginning of 1973.

Fenella was sold to Greek owners, E. Mastichiades of Piraeus and renamed Vasso M. On 2 February 1977, after some years plying in the Mediterranean, she caught fire and sank two nautical miles off Borolos Light House, Damietta when en route from Alexandria to Jeddah with a cargo of medical cotton and rice.

References

Bibliography
 Chappell, Connery (1980). Island Lifeline T.Stephenson & Sons Ltd 

1951 ships
Ships of the Isle of Man Steam Packet Company
Ferries of the Isle of Man
Merchant ships of the United Kingdom
Maritime incidents in 1977
Ships built on the River Clyde